Israel Sánchez Matos (born August 20, 1963 in Falcon Lasvias, Cuba) is a former Major League Baseball pitcher who played for two seasons. He pitched in 19 games for the Kansas City Royals during the 1988 Kansas City Royals season and 11 games during the 1990 Kansas City Royals season.

External links

1963 births
Living people
Major League Baseball pitchers
Major League Baseball players from Cuba
Cuban expatriate baseball players in the United States
Kansas City Royals players
Baseball City Royals players
Charleston Royals players
Fort Myers Royals players
Gulf Coast Royals players
Memphis Chicks players
Omaha Royals players
Rochester Red Wings players